The Billboard Music Award winners for Top Rap Artist:. Distinguished people that have won the award include Drake, Kanye West, Mase, Winky D, T.I., and Lil Wayne. In 2018 the category was split into top Male and Female rap artists.

Winners and nominees (1997-present)

Most wins and nominations

The following individuals received three or more Top Rap Artist Awards:

The following individuals received two or more Top Rap Artist nominations: 50 Cent and Eminem won all their nominations.

References

Billboard awards